A constitutional referendum was held in Liberia on 27 September 1847. The new constitution would create a President with executive powers and a bicameral Legislature. It would also restrict voting rights to those of African descent and landowners. It was approved by 79% of voters (although only 272 people voted). In Monrovia, Millsburg, Bassa Cove and Bexley 100% of voters supported the constitution, whilst 100% voted against it in Sinoe. In Edina opponents of the constitution prevented the polling station opening, and a fist-fight broke out between Amos Herrnig and Ephraim Titler, two of the Liberian Declaration of Independence signatories. Opponents of the constitution in Bassa Cove and Bexley chose not to vote.

Results

By town

References

1847 referendums
1847 in Liberia
1847
Constitutional referendums in Liberia
September 1847 events